Edwin Edwards (1927–2021) was the 50th governor of Louisiana.

Edwin Edwards may also refer to:
Edwin Edwards (artist) (1823–1879), British painter, engraver and lawyer
Edwin Edwards (New Zealand politician) (1862–1909), English-born New Zealand businessman and local politician
Edwin Edwards (organist) (1830–1907), British academic and organist
Eddie Edwards (musician) (1891–1963, Edwin Branford Edwards), American jazz trombonist

See also
Eddie Edwards (disambiguation)
Edward Edwards (disambiguation)